Bagneris is a surname. Notable people with the surname include:

John Bagneris, American politician
Larry Bagneris Jr. (born 1946), American social and political activist
Vernel Bagneris (born 1949), American playwright, actor, director, singer, and dancer